Abudureyimu Ajiyiming (or ; 1943–2011) was a Chinese politician and accountant.

Biography
Abudureyimu was born on 5 March 1943 in Kashgar Prefecture, Xinjiang. Of Uyghur ethnicity, he was a native of Xinjiang.

He became a senior account and began working in August 1962 and held several accountancy positions in the Xinjiang Uyghur Autonomous Regional branch of the People's Bank of China.

He served as vice chairman for many of the regional committees in Xinjiang and from 2003 to 2008 was Honorary Chairman of the Xinjiang Federation of Returned Overseas Chinese for the Xinjiang Uyghur Autonomous Region.

He retired in January 2010. He died of illness in Urumqi on 3 July 2011.

References 
 Biography in China Vitae

1943 births
2011 deaths
People's Republic of China politicians from Xinjiang
Chinese accountants
Uyghurs
People from Kashgar